The CERATIZIT Group is a manufacturer of hard material products for wear protection and cutting tools. It is 100% owned by Plansee Holding AG. The company holds more than 1,000 patents worldwide and manufactured more than 10 billion sintered parts in 2010. The company is the world's fourth largest producer of hard metals.

History
CERATIZIT S.A. was created in 2002 as the result of a merger between the companies CERAMETAL (founded in 1931) and Plansee Tizit (founded in 1985). CERAMETAL was founded in Walferdange, Luxembourg, by Nicolas Lanners. In 1948, the cooperation started between CERAMETAL and the company then known as Plansee GmbH. In 1979, CERAMETAL launched production operations in the USA and the first ceramic parts were manufactured in 1988. In 1996, Instrument AG in Bulgaria was incorporated in Plansee Tizit while, at the same time, collaboration got underway with Siel to form Siel Tizit Ltd. in the Indian city of Kolkata. Following the start-up of CERATIZIT S.A in 2002, the company opened sales offices in Brazil, Poland, Hungary and the Czech Republic. In 2007, new administrative premises were unveiled in Mamer and Reutte, while sales and marketing offices were opened in China, Mexico and Spain. In 2007, CERATIZIT acquired Newcomer Products, Inc., a private company based in Latrobe/Pennsylvania. In 2010, CERATIZIT and CB Carbide combined their Asian activities within the joint venture company CB-CERATIZIT in which both CERATIZIT and the members of CB Carbide possess a 50% holding.  In 2011, Ceratizit moved its USA corporate headquarters from Latrobe, PA to Warren, Michigan.

Locations
CERATIZIT's headquarters office is located in Mamer, Luxembourg. As of 2022, it had 7,000 employees and more than 25 production sites in Europe, North America and Asia, and a sales network of over 70 branch offices.

Products
CERATIZIT develops, produces and markets a wide array of cutting and wear-protection products based on hard metals, cermets or technical ceramics, from powders to (semi-)finished tools and coated components.  The products include hard metal rods and reformed blanks for milling and drilling tools, blanks for printed circuit boards, blades, dies and die blanks for metal cutting and punching, nozzles, hobs, and milling rollers.

The company also produces tools for woodworking and stonemasonry, such as hammer, saw, drill, and router tips.

References

External links 
 CERATIZIT.com

Manufacturing companies of Luxembourg